Solanas is a small village administrated by Sinnai, in the province of Cagliari.

Position
Solanas is located in the south coast of Sardinia at ~36 km east from Cagliari, and at ~16 km west from Villasimius. 
It is administrated by Sinnai (which is 34 km away) and its territory is unique as it is not joined to Sinnai. Solanas is surrounded by the territory of Maracalagonis and Villasimius.

Tourism
Solanas comprises a small town with main facilities (pharmacy, supermarket, butcher, church, news shop, pizzerias, restaurants, hotels) which usually operate only from June to September, and a wonderful sandy beach which is ~1 km long. In the summer several bars are located in the beach, together with water-sport equipment (windsurf, water-skis, canoe, boat etc.) hiring facilities.

Mari Pintau (9 km), Geremeas and Kala 'e Moru (8 km), Genn'e Mari (4 km), Cann'e Sisa (4 km) are the closest beaches nearby.

Related
Sinnai

External links
See Solanas on the Map SardegnaMappe.it 
See Solanas on SardegnaDigitalLibrary.it
See Solanas beach on SardegnaTurismo.it

Frazioni of the Province of Cagliari